Cnidiocarpa is a genus of flowering plant in the family Apiaceae, native to the Caucasus and Central Asia. It has two species.

References 

Apioideae
Apioideae genera